South Plains Mall is a  shopping mall located in Lubbock, Texas. It is located at the northwest corner of Loop 289 and Slide Road. South Plains Mall is anchored by two Dillard's locations, JCPenney, Barnes & Noble bookstore, and a 16-screen (with an IMAX) Premiere Cinemas. There are two vacant anchors last occupied by Bealls and Sears. The mall contains over 145 shops, restaurants, and kiosks. The mall serves the entire South Plains region.

Macerich purchased the mall in 1998 for $115.7 million from the original developer, South Plains Mall Associates Ltd. It has been expanded to  since opening. It is the only regional mall within  and it serves an estimated market of 500,000 people (including West Texas and Eastern New Mexico).

In 2015, Sears Holdings spun off 235 of its properties, including the Sears at South Plains Mall, into Seritage Growth Properties. Sears closed on January 9, 2019.

On December 5, 2019, it was revealed by Lubbock in the Loop that New York and Company would close.

In August 2020, Bealls closed, due to the COVID-19 pandemic.

On July 26, 2022, SPM had celebrated 50 years with Chick Fil-A making sandwiches as cheap as $0.50.

In mid-November, SPM was revealed to have a Dillard's move into the west side, although not immediately since the former Sears was to be demolished after Christmas. However, said demolition did not happen until late January 2023.

References

External links
South Plains Mall official website

Shopping malls in Lubbock, Texas
Shopping malls established in 1972
1972 establishments in Texas
Buildings and structures in Lubbock, Texas
Macerich